Events from the year 1403 in France

Incumbents
 Monarch – Charles VI

Events

Births

22 February – Charles VII of France (died 1461).

Full date missing
John IV, Duke of Brabant (died 1427)
Guigone de Salins, noble (died 1470)

Deaths

References

1400s in France